Conat may refer to:

People
 Abraham Conat, Italian Jewish printer, Talmudist, and physician
 Estellina Conat (fl. 1474–1477), Italian-Jewish printer, first woman known to be active as a printer

Places
 Conat, Pyrénées-Orientales, France